Mahmoud Tounsi (13 December 1944, in Menzel Temime – 12 April 2001, in Menzel Temime) was a Tunisian author and painter.

Biography 
Tounsi was born on December 13, 1944 in Menzel Temime. He attended primary school in his hometown and then high school in Tunis before studying at the Tunis Institute of Fine Arts where noted painter Abdelaziz Gorgi was professor. Working in the staff of Radio Tunis and Tunis 7, he taught fine arts at the Menzel Temime high school.

After pursuing the above careers, Tounsi became mayor of Menzel Temime. On April 12, 2001, travelling to Tunisia's Ministry of Culture to propose the creation of a theater, Tounsi was killed in a car accident aged 56.

Work 
Tounsi's literary work, while varied (poems, short stories, articles and studies specialized in painting) is limited. However, according to the Dictionary of Tunisian Writers, his works were important on the Tunisian cultural scene. One of his most famous pieces of writing was Espace, a collection of short stories published in 1973 and which paved the way to the avant-garde movement.

Tounsi was one of the founders of the National Council for Freedoms, which led to the creation of the Tunisian League of Human Rights.  He eventually established a painting career which eclipsed his written one in terms of success.

References 

1944 births
2001 deaths
People from Nabeul Governorate
Movement of Socialist Democrats politicians
Democratic Constitutional Rally politicians
20th-century Tunisian poets
Road incident deaths in Tunisia
20th-century Tunisian painters
20th-century poets
Tunis Institute of Fine Arts alumni